Noct is a term trademarked by Nikon to describe a line of special camera lenses. The word was first used in the name of the Noct-Nikkor 58mm f/1.2 lens from the 1970s and re-appeared in 2018, when it was applied to the new Z mount 58mm f/0.95 S Noct.

References 

Nikon lenses